The 27 species in the genus Marmosa are relatively small Neotropical members of the family Didelphidae. This genus is one of three that are known as mouse opossums. The others are Thylamys (the "fat-tailed mouse opossums") and Tlacuatzin, the grayish mouse opossum. Members of the genus Marmosops used to be called "slender mouse opossums", but are now just called "slender opossums". The thirteen members of the Marmosa subgenus Micoureus, known as woolly mouse opossums, were formerly considered to be a separate genus, but were moved into Marmosa in 2009. Based on a comparison of sequences of one mitochondrial and three nuclear genes, three new subgenera, Eomarmosa, Exulomarmosa and Stegomarmosa, were recognized by Voss et al. in 2014. Eomarmosa and Exulomarmosa, as well as Marmosa and Micoureus, are thought to be sister taxa, while Stegomarmosa is viewed as sister to Marmosa plus Micoureus. Exulomarmosa is a mostly trans-Andean (west of the Andes) clade.

Subgenus Eomarmosa Voss, Gutierrez, Solari, Rossi & Jansa 2014
Marmosa rubra Tate 1931
Subgenus Exulomarmosa Voss, Gutierrez, Solari, Rossi & Jansa 2014
Marmosa isthmica 
Marmosa mexicana Merriam 1897
Marmosa robinsoni Bangs 1898
Marmosa simonsi 
Marmosa xerophila Handley & Gordon 1979
Marmosa zeledoni 
Subgenus Marmosa Gray 1821
Marmosa macrotarsus 
Marmosa murina (Linnaeus 1758)
Marmosa tyleriana Tate 1931
Marmosa waterhousei 
Subgenus Micoureus Lesson 1842
 Marmosa alstoni 
 Marmosa constantiae 
 Marmosa demerarae 
Marmosa germana
 Marmosa paraguayana 
Marmosa jansae
Marmosa limae
Marmosa meridae
Marmosa parda
Marmosa perplexa
 Marmosa phaea 
Marmosa rapposa
 Marmosa regina 
Marmosa rutteri
Marmosa adleri 
Subgenus Stegomarmosa Pine 1972
Marmosa andersoni Pine 1972
Marmosa lepida (Thomas 1888)

References

Opossums
Marsupial genera
Taxa named by John Edward Gray